Apollo Sunshine is the second studio album from the Boston area indie rock group Apollo Sunshine.  It was released on spinART Records in September 2005 as a follow-up to the band's debut record Katonah.  The album garnered more attention for the band than their debut,  and was named to the Amazon.com Best of 2005: Editors' Picks in Rock list at number 5.  This ranked them above such veteran acts as The Rolling Stones, the Foo Fighters and Nine Inch Nails, and in the company of more well-known bands such as The White Stripes, Bob Dylan, and Oasis.

Track listing
"Flip!"  – 4:15
"Ghost"  – 3:44
"A Finger Pointing at the Moon"  – 0:33
"Phony Marony"  – 2:03
"Today Is the Day"  – 2:19	
"The Hotter, the Wetter, the Better"  – 2:35
"Eyes"  – 2:01
"Phone Sex"  – 3:24
"Magnolia"  – 2:28
"Phyllis"  – 4:10
"God"  – 1:51
"Lord"  – 5:22
"Bed"  – 3:24

References

Apollo Sunshine albums
2005 albums